Tien Feng (born Tien Yu-kun, 4 June 1928 – 22 October 2015) was a Chinese actor, who appeared in hundreds of films in Taiwan and Hong Kong.

He has acted with Bruce Lee in Fist of Fury (1972) and with Jackie Chan in Little Tiger of Canton (1971) The Young Master (1980) and Miracles (1989).

Filmography

Film
 As actor

As director
1971: The Golden Seal - also actor
1976: The Double Double Cross - also actor

Television series

See also
Cinema of Hong Kong
Cinema of Taiwan
Fist of Fury

References

External links

Hong Kong Cinemagic: Tien Feng

1928 births
Male actors from Henan
2015 deaths
Taiwanese male film actors
Taiwanese male television actors
20th-century Taiwanese male actors
21st-century Taiwanese male actors
People from Zhengzhou
Taiwanese film directors
Taiwanese people from Henan
Chinese male film actors
Chinese male television actors
20th-century Chinese male actors
21st-century Chinese male actors